The R282 road is a regional road in County Leitrim, Ireland connecting the N16 in Manorhamilton with Rossinver (links R281 to Kinlough/Glenfarne) and across the border around Lough Melvin becoming the B53 to Garrison, County Fermanagh.

See also
Regional road

References

Roads in County Leitrim
Regional roads in the Republic of Ireland